Tingo Maria National Park is located in the districts of Rupa Rupa and Mariano Dámaso, in the region of Huánuco, Peru. It was established on May 14, 1965 and its main attractions are the montane forest vegetation and the cave named Cueva de las Lechuzas (Spanish for Cave of the Owls) where the oilbirds nest. The park has an area of  that include a mountain massif called La Bella Durmiente (Spanish for Sleeping Beauty).

History 
In 1940, 2 years after the foundation of the nearby town of Tingo Maria, some forest areas were spared from human development to create a new protected natural area.

In 1950, during the dictatorship of Manuel A. Odría, a protected area called Cueva de las Lechuzas National Reserve was created in the area of the future national park.

On May 14, 1965, Tingo Maria National Park was established by Law No. 15574, which stated that the area include the Bella Durmiente massif, the cave named Cueva de Las Lechuzas and adjacent forests. However, the law didn't specify the total area or the boundaries of the park.

In 2000, boundaries were defined and the total area was fixed at 4777,8 hectares.

Geography 

Topography in the park is steep and mountainous, because the Bella Durmiente massif occupies almost of its entire extension. Elevations in the park are in the range of 650–1808 m; rocky walls of 300–500 m in height are common. Soils are calcareous, rocky and thin, and landslides due to natural causes or past attempts of agriculture do occur.

Tingo Maria National Park is located at the confluence of the rivers Huallaga and Monzón (the name tingo, comes from Quechua for confluence or meeting). Due to the calcareous nature of the mountains, several rivers in the park have eroded the rock to form underground courses.

Climate 
The rainy season in the area goes from October to April, with a mean annual precipitation of 3300 mm. Access to the park in that season is limited due to weather conditions. The annual temperatures in the area have a maximum of 29.8 °C and a minimum of 19.2 °C, being the annual mean 24.5 °C.

Ecology

Flora 
Vegetation in the park is characterized by the presence of very humid montane forests frequently covered with mist, and trees covered with epiphyte plants, mosses and lichens due to humidity.

Among the most notable plant species in the park are trees like cedro colorado (Cedrela odorata), palo blanco (Cinchona pubescens), cumala blanca (Virola calophylla), cumala colorada (Iryanthera laevis), quinilla (Manilkara bidentata subsp. surinamensis), sapotillo (Quararibea macrocalyx), tulpay (Clarisia racemosa) and lagarto caspi (Calophyllum brasiliense); palms like huasaí (Euterpe precatoria), ungurahui (Oenocarpus bataua), pona (Iriartea deltoidea), yarina (Phytelephas macrocarpa) and palmiche (Geonoma spp.); tree ferns (Cyathea spp.) and numerous orchids, being the most frequent Phragmipedium spp. (although Phragmipedium besseae is a threatened species).

Fauna 
Among the mammals present in the park are the South American tapir, the red brocket, the collared peccary, the ocelot, the black-capped squirrel monkey, the brown-mantled tamarin monkey, the red-faced spider monkey, the nine-banded armadillo, the pacarana, the Northern Amazon red squirrel, the kinkajou, and the South American coati.

Birds reported in the area are the Andean cock-of-the-rock, the oilbird, the white-eyed parakeet, Salvin's curassow, Spix's guan, the blue-headed parrot, the king vulture, the Amazonian motmot, among others.

Activities 
Birdwatching, hiking, ecotourism and cultural tourism are the main activities in the area.

Environmental issues 
Environmental issues that affect the biodiversity of this national park are: the extraction of wood for construction or fuel; the clearance of forest for agricultural crops, coca and pastures; uncontrolled tourism; hunting; fishing with toxins and explosives; the noise of helicopters departing from a nearby airbase; obstruction of an underground river due to debris from deforestation by nearby villages; and the extraction of gravel and other construction materials.

See also
La Bella Durmiente, Peru

References

External links 
 Tingo Maria National Park. Profile at protectedplanet.net

National parks of Peru
Geography of Huánuco Region
Tourist attractions in Huánuco Region
1965 establishments in Peru
Protected areas established in 1965